The Age of the Earth is a 1980 avant-garde film directed by Glauber Rocha.

Cast
Maurício do Valle as John Brahms
Jece Valadão as Indigenous Christ
Antonio Pitanga as Black Christ
Tarcísio Meira as Military Christ 
Geraldo Del Rey as Guerilla Christ 
Ana Maria Magalhães as Aurora Madalena 
Norma Bengell as Amazonas' Queen 
Carlos Petrovich as the Devil
Mário Gusmão as Babalawo
Danuza Leão 
Paloma Rocha

Production
Rocha started the film in 1975 and planned to shoot it in Los Angeles, and subsequently proposed it in Paris, Rome, Mexico and Venezuela, but was unable to obtain financial support. It was finally shot in Bahia, Distrito Federal, and Rio de Janeiro.

Reception
It was Rocha's last film and the one that caused the most controversy. Because it was produced by Embrafilme, a state company, during the Brazilian military dictatorship, it was boycotted by critics and "crucified at the 1980 Venice Film Festival", where it was nominated for the Golden Lion.

References

External links

1980s avant-garde and experimental films
1980 drama films
1980 films
Brazilian avant-garde and experimental films
Brazilian drama films
Films directed by Glauber Rocha
Films shot in Brasília
Films shot in Rio de Janeiro (city)
1980s Portuguese-language films